Nathaniel Alexander (March 5, 1756March 7, 1808) was a slave owner, physician and the 13th Governor of the U.S. state of North Carolina from 1805 to 1807.

Biography
Alexander was born in 1756, in what was at the time known as Anson County in the Province of North Carolina (his birthplace is located near the modern city of Concord). He was the son of a local sheriff. He earned a bachelor's degree from the College of New Jersey (now Princeton University) in 1776 and was commissioned as a surgeon in the North Carolina Line in 1779. He served through the American Revolutionary War until 1782, and then practiced medicine for a time near Santee, South Carolina. He was distinguished as a politician but also as a physician, with Toner stating that he was a "physician of eminence in Mecklenburg."

Returning to his native North Carolina, Alexander was elected to the North Carolina House of Commons in 1797, to the North Carolina Senate in 1801, and to the United States House of Representatives in 1803.

On November 25, 1805, Alexander was elected governor by the North Carolina General Assembly and served two one-year terms in that office, declining to run for a third. Although a Democratic-Republican, he enjoyed support from the Federalists as well. As governor, he oversaw the resolution of a boundary dispute with Georgia, the expansion of the state's district courts, and the growth of the state's educational system. While governor, he was also president of The University of North Carolina Board of Trustees.
Only a few months after stepping down as governor, Alexander died in Salisbury, North Carolina; he is buried in Old Settlers' Cemetery in Charlotte, North Carolina.

He married a daughter of a Colonel Thomas Polk, but the couple was apparently childless.

Notes

References
 Biographical Directory of the Governors of the United States, 1789–1978, Robert Sobel and John Raimo, eds. Westport, CT: Meckler Books, 1978.

External links 

1756 births
1808 deaths
People from Concord, North Carolina
Governors of North Carolina
Members of the North Carolina House of Representatives
North Carolina state senators
Continental Army officers from North Carolina
Princeton University alumni
Democratic-Republican Party members of the United States House of Representatives from North Carolina
Democratic-Republican Party state governors of the United States
People of colonial North Carolina
18th-century American physicians
University of North Carolina at Chapel Hill people